Mirzapur is an Indian action crime thriller   streaming television series created for Amazon Prime Video, by Karan Anshuman, who wrote the script along with Puneet Krishna & Vineet Krishna. Anshuman directed the first season of the series, along with Gurmmeet Singh and Mihit Desai,the latter of whom directed the second season. The series is produced by Rithesh Sidhwani and Farhan Akhtar of Excel Entertainment. The story follows Akhandanand Tripathi (Pankaj Tripathi), also known as Kaleen Bhaiya, the mafia don and proverbial ruler of Mirzapur in the Purvanchal region of Uttar Pradesh. In the first season,the main cast features Pankaj Tripathi, Shweta Tripathi, Divyendu Sharma, Ali Fazal, Vikrant Massey, Shriya Pilgaonkar, Rasika Dugal, Harshita Gaur and Kulbhushan Kharbanda. The second season retains the principal cast from the first season, excluding Massey and Pilgaonkar, with new cast consisting of Vijay Varma, Isha Talwar, Lilliput, Anjum Sharma, Priyanshu Painyuli, Anangsha Biswas and Neha Sargam.

The series was filmed mostly across Uttar Pradesh, primarily shot in Mirzapur, and many locations which include Jaunpur, Azamgarh, Ghazipur, Lucknow, Raebareli, Gorakhpur, and Varanasi. Sanjay Kapoor served as the cinematographer, with Manan Mehta and Anshul Gupta edited the series. John Stewart Eduri composed the background score.

The first season of Mirzapur was released on 16 November 2018. The series opened to positive response from audiences, while critics gave mixed reviews. The performances of the cast members, particularly Pankaj Tripathi's, received rave response. It eventually became the most popular web series in India, after Sacred Games. The second season of Mirzapur was released on 23 October 2020. The third season of the show will be expected in 2023 as its cast is on its way.

Premise
The iron-fisted Akhandanand Tripathi is a millionaire carpet exporter and the mafia don of Mirzapur. His son, Munna, is an unworthy, power-hungry heir who will stop at nothing to inherit his father's legacy. An incident at a wedding procession forces him to cross paths with Ramakant Pandit, an upstanding lawyer, and his sons, Guddu and Bablu. It snowballs into a game of ambition, power and greed that threatens the fabric of this lawless city.

Cast

Overview

Main
Pankaj Tripathi as Akhandanand Tripathi a.k.a. "Kaleen Bhaiya": He runs a carpet business along with the business of production of illegal guns (katta). He is a cunning and power-obsessed man, Satyanand's elder son, Beena's husband, and Munna's father. (Season 1)
Divyenndu as Phoolchand Tripathi a.k.a. "Munna": Kaleen Bhaiya's son, Satyanand's grandson, and Madhuri's husband. He is obsessed with becoming the "King of Mirzapur" which leads to frequent arguments with his father, Akhandanand. (Season 1Season 2)
Ali Fazal as Govind "Guddu" Pandit: Ramakant and Vasudha's elder son, Sweety's husband, and later Shabnam's lover. He wanted to be Mr. Purvanchal after winning the contest but later worked as an employee in Kaleen Bhaiya's illegal business of guns. After Munna kills Bablu and Sweety, he sets out to take revenge. (Season 1)
Vikrant Massey as Vinay "Bablu" Pandit: Ramakant and Vasudha's younger son, who was excellent in studies and wanted to be an IAS Officer by clearing UPSC exam, but later worked as an employee in Kaleen Bhaiya's illegal business of guns. He later got shot by Munna on Akhandanand's order. (Season 1)
Shriya Pilgaonkar as Swaragini "Sweety" Gupta Pandit: Parshuram's elder daughter, Golu's sister and Guddu's wife. She was a strong and independent woman. Later, gets shot by Munna. (Season 1)
Kulbhushan Kharbanda as Satyanand Tripathi a.k.a. "Bauji": Former King of Mirzapur; Akhandanand's father and Munna's grandfather who is the patriarch of the Tripathi family. He is a ruthless and male-dominative man. He blackmailed Beena and coerced Radhiya to have sex with him. (Season 1Season 2)
Lilliput as Devdatt Tyagi a.k.a. "Dadda": Bharat and Shatrughan's father, and Geeta's husband. He is a dealer of alcohol and stole motors and a powerful man of Bihar. (Season 3)
Rasika Dugal as Beena Tripathi: Akhandanand's second wife, Satyanand's daughter-in-law and Munna's stepmother. (Season 1)
Shweta Tripathi Sharma as Gajgamini "Golu" Gupta: A nerdy, intelligent college student who always reads books; Parshuram's younger daughter and Sweety's younger sister. Her character becomes more dark and violent when she sets to take revenge after Munna killed Bablu and Sweety. (Season 1)
Isha Talwar as Madhuri Yadav Tripathi, Surya's daughter, Munna's wife. She becomes the CM of Uttar Pradesh after her father dies. (Season 2)
Vijay Varma as Bharat Tyagi: Devdatt and Geeta's elder son and Saloni's husband (Season 2) 
Vijay Varma as Shatrughan Tyagi: Devdatt and Geeta's younger son, and Golu's love interest. (Season 2)
Amit Sial as Senior Superintendent of Police Ram Sharan Maurya, Special Officer assigned to Mirzapur (Season 1Season 2)

Recurring

 Harshita Shekhar Gaur as Dimpy Pandit: She is sweet, innocent, obedient and sharp Ramakant and Vasudha's daughter and Guddu and Bablu's younger sister, she was kidnapped by Munna to seek revenge from Guddu and Bablu. (Season 1-)
Rajesh Tailang as Ramakant Pandit: A reputed and a loyal lawyer, Vasudha's husband and Guddu, Bablu and Dimpy's father (Season 1-)
Sheeba Chaddha as Vasudha Pandit: Ramakant Pandit's wife and Guddu, Bablu and Dimpy's mother (Season 1-)
Priyanshu Painyuli as 'Robin' Agarwal: Dimpy's fiancée. (Season 2-)
Shaji Choudhary as Maqbool Khan, After Rati Shankar firstly Satyanand and now also Akhandanand's trusted henchman later turned enemy. (Season 1-)
Aasif Khan as Babar Khan, Maqbool's nephew (Season 1–2)
Abhishek Banerjee as Subodh. He is often called Compounder because he is a quack pharmacist. (Season 1)
Brahma Mishra as Lalit, Munna Bhaiya's right-hand man (Season 1–2)
Shahnawaz Pradhan as Superintendent of Police Parshuram Gupta, Golu and Sweety's father (Season 1-)
Pramod Pathak as Jai Prakash "J.P." Yadav, younger brother of Chief Minister Surya Pratap Yadav (Season 1-)
Shubrajyoti Barat as Rati Shankar Shukla: Bahubali of Jaunpur, Shakuntala's husband and Sharad's father also the rival of Tripathi's. (Season 1)
Anjum Sharma as Sharad Shukla, Rati Shankar and Shakuntala's son. (Season 1-)
Anil George as Lala; father of Shabnam and the maker and seller of opium. (Season 1-)
Akash Singh Rajput as Daara: Shabnam's fiancé who gets shot by Munna Tripathi gang during their marriage reception (Season 1) Dead
Shernavaz Jijina as Shabnam: Lala's daughter (Season 1-)
Manu Rishi as Police IG Vishudanand Dubey (Season 1-)
Prashansa Sharma as Radhiya: Tripathi family's house help who was assaulted by Munna and later Satyanand too. (Season 1-)
Anangsha Biswas as Zarina a nightstand later PA of JP (Season 1-)
Hemant Kapadia as Imran Alam (Season 1–2)
Nitin Mahesh Joshi as Raja: the male servant of Tripathi family who had sex with Beena and was caught red-handed by Satyanand who punished and then ousted him from Tripathi Kothi. (Season 1–2)
Paritosh Sand as Chief Minister (CM) Surya Pratap Yadav: Madhuri's father, CM of Uttar Pradesh and Munna's father in law. (Season 2)
Meghna Malik as Shakuntala Shukla, Rati Shankar's wife and mother of Sharad. (Season 2-)
Shrikant Verma as Mamaji, Dadda Tyagi's Brother-in-law and Geeta's brother (Season 2)
Alka Amin as Geeta Tyagi: Devdatt's wife and Bharat and Shatrughan's mother (Season 2-)
Neha Sargam as Saloni Tyagi: Bharat's wife and Geeta and Dadda's daughter in law (Season 2-)
Santosh Bhokare as Police Officer Pandey
Mukesh Bhatt as Haseena
Dibyendu Bhattacharya as Doctor (Season 2)
Rohit Tiwari as PA Anand (Season 2-)
Ali Quli Mirza as Sheku Bhai: A hairdresser who gets killed by Guddu (Season 2)

Episodes

Series overview

Season 1

Season 2

Production

Development 
In August 2016, Amazon Studios collaborated with Excel Entertainment to produce their first two Indian original series for the platform, with one of them titled Inside Edge (2017), which is based on sports, and a crime-thriller series, in order to extend it service in the country, ahead of the launch of Amazon Prime Video in India in December 2016. In March 2017, the makers announced about the crime drama series which is set in Mirzapur in Uttar Pradesh. Rithesh Sidhwani and Farhan Akhtar, said that the series is loosely based on the Netflix series Narcos.

Karan Anshuman created the series, who also wrote the script with Puneet Krishna and Vineet Krishna, and directed the series along with Gurmmeet Singh and Mihir Desai. In an interview with Devarsi Ghosh of Scroll.in, Anshuman stated that he has been a big fan of the Hinterland western genre, and also watched films such as Omkara (2006) and Gangs of Wasseypur series, however, due to the restrictions in the medium, the genre cannot be possible in cinema, as it demands extreme violence and brutality. He added "We had this idea for a gangster drama, and I felt that the best way to do it in India was to set it in the hinterlands, in the back of beyond. We [co-writers Puneet Krishna and Vineet Krishna] had access to a lot of stories based on our research, but we wanted to create a world that was hyper-real and amped up. We created a world of violence where even the nicest person would own a gun and could pull the trigger if the need arose. But the characters and their relationships are emotional. All the characters are heroes in their own arc, so everyone will find someone to relate to."

In March 2020, the makers announced for a third instalment in the series, with its pre-production work being underway. Amazon Prime Video, officially announced for a third season on 12 November 2020.

Casting 
The series revolves around the principal character Pankaj Tripathi who plays the role of Akhandanad Tripathi (Kaleen Bhayya), a mafia boss and millionaire carpet exporter. In a 30-second teaser released in October 2018, it features clip largely comprises shots from a factory in Mirzapur where guns are manufactured in the garb of carpets, and Kaleen Bhayya is behind this illegal business. Divyendu Sharma, Ali Fazal, Vikrant Massey appears in other principal roles alongside Shweta Tripathi, Shriya Pilgaonkar, Rasika Dugal, Harshita Gaur and Kulbhushan Kharbanda. Anshuman stated that the characters in the series are real, but the world they are in is larger than life, similar to the worlds of Quentin Tarantino and Robert Rodriguez. He eventually conceived that the characters Guddu (Ali Fazal) and Bablu (Vikrant Massey), were inspired two real boys who rode a bike and went around terrorising the town. He further added Guddu's character was inspired from a bodybuilder's look.

In an interview published on an online portal in February 2020, Vikrant Massey revealed that the makers of the series had kept him in dark about his character's demise, till the day of the shoot. Reportedly, Vikrant Massey's character Vinay Pandit (Bablu) was brutally murdered in the climax of season 1. He exclaimed that the makers had kept his death under the wraps to reportedly make the audiences more curious about his character. However his character did not have a cameo appearance in the second season. Although Shriya's character Swaragini Gupta Pandit (Sweety), had a cameo appearance in the second season.

The second season has the recurring cast from the first one with Sharad Shukla, Vijay Varma, Isha Talwar, Lilliput, Anjum Sharma, Priyanshu Painyuli, Anangsha Biswas and Neha Sargam, joined the new addition to the cast.

Filming

Season 1 
Filming of first season began on 27 September 2017, with the badminton sequence was the first scene to be shot. Ali Fazal and Shweta Tripathi joined the sets in Varanasi on 30 September. The story is set in Mirzapur and Bhadohi in Uttar Pradesh, but however the story is fictionalised and was not based on real Mirzapur. The primary locations for the shooting of the series included Jaunpur, Azamgarh, Ghazipur, Lucknow, Raebareli, Gorakhpur, and Varanasi. The show makers have taken areal shots of the Ganga river in Uttar Pradesh, and Another important location for the series was the Badohi district. Shooting of the series got wrapped up in June 2018.

Season 2 
Post the announcement of the second season in February 2019, the makers kickstarted shoot in May 2019. In a report from BoxOfficeIndia, it was revealed that shooting of the series was done majorly in Uttar Pradesh. Reportedly, the filming started from Lucknow and it was mostly shot in the extensions of the city. The series was also shot in Benaras and some other parts of the state. The makers wrapped the shooting of the series in October 2019.

Season 3 
At the end of July 2022 Excel Entertainment announced on their Instagram story that the shooting of Mirzapur season 3 has started. but not confirmed yet

Music

For the songs "Tittar Bittar", Bhaskar roped in his entire band Anand Bhaskar Collective, along with indie musician Isheeta Chakravarty to render vocals for this number. Ginny Diwan, the lyricist of this song penned the lyrics within an hour. Anand stated that "It's an 'item song' from a woman's point of view while a fight is on. I'm grateful the directors supported our wacky ideas". Later he also roped in Shipla Surroch and Keka Ghoshal, who were also independent singers to record the album. Anand Bhaskar planned to compose a wedding song for Guddu (Ali Fazal) and Sweety (Shriya Pilagonkar) which is touted to be a Sufi number. An original song titled "Varoon" was created for the same.

Release 
A 30-second teaser of Mirzapur, which features the voiceover of Pankaj Tripathi was released on 2 October 2018. Another teaser trailer featuring Ali Fazal's character was unveiled on 11 October 2018. The first poster of Mirzapur was released on 16 October 2018, and the following day, the makers released the official trailer of the series on 17 October. Mirzapur was screened the Mumbai Film Festival, with the first two episodes were premiered on 27 October 2018 at PVR Versova in Mumbai, which was the one and only screening of the Prime Original during the festival run. The first season of the series aired on Amazon Prime Video on 16 October 2018, through Hindi, Tamil and Telugu languages.

Mirzapur was screened at the Television Critics Association's summer press tour held in Los Angeles in February 2019, where the makers officially announced the second season of the series, along with seven original contents from India. On 16 November 2019, coinciding the anniversary of the first season, the makers shared the sneak peek of the second season, which eventually announced for a release in March 2020. But the release was further delayed, as post-production works came to a halt due to COVID-19 pandemic. On 24 August 2020, the makers announced for a scheduled release on 23 October 2020. The trailer was released on 7 October 2020.

Ahead of the release, fans erected huge cut-outs across eight cities in Uttar Pradesh. Mirzapur: Season 2's first two episodes was premiered through Amazon Prime Video on 22 October 2020, a day ahead of its scheduled premiere, and rest of the episodes were released on 23 October. Although, the second season eventually released with the original Hindi language, the makers released the dubbed Tamil and Telugu version on 11 December 2020.

Reception

Critical response

Season 1 
Mirzapur: Season 1 eventually received positive response from audiences, whereas critics gave mixed reviews to the series. Rohan Naahar of the Hindustan Times, gave two out of five and stated "Mirzapur doesn't aim high, and yet it fails to hit its target. A more mature approach to the violence and a more focused plot would greatly benefit the second season, were there to be one." Ektaa Malik of The Indian Express claimed that "The nine-part series, with almost hour-long episodes, is a tedious watch, and even its top-notch cast can't save this mammoth show from sinking." Saraswati Datar from The News Minute reviewed "A brilliant cast of actors led by Pankaj Tripathi is let down by an inconsistent script and indulgent direction." Saibal Chatterjee of NDTV gave two out of five two the series, and stated "Barring a couple of sequences in the first two episodes, Mirzapur never finds a way out of the drably pedestrian." Stutee Ghosh from The Quint gave two-and-a-half out of five stars and stated  "Mirzapur runs out of steam early on and never truly recovers, but it does have one saving grace."

In a positive note Nandini Ramanth of Scroll.in stated "The violence in Mirzapur is nearly always gratuitous in its operatics, but Pankaj Tripathi's nuanced and hugely enjoyable performance is among the grace notes." Rahul Desai of Film Companion rated it three-out-of-five stars and stated "Featuring some of Hindi cinema's most talented actors, it's no surprise that the performances paper over awkward cracks in the narrative balance." Umesh Punwani of Koimoi gave four out of five stars saying "What makes it different is the portion of entertainment and thrills attached with every episode."

Season 2 
Saibal Chatterjee of NDTV, gave two-and-a-half out of five stars and stated ""One key difference between the two seasons is in the pacing of the narrative. Season 2, as expected, fires on all cylinders, but in an infinitely more controlled manner. The language continues to be gratingly coarse. However, the scenes of violence, even when they are fervidly excessive, aren't delivered merely to boost the shock quotient as was often the case in S1." Udita Jhunjhunwala from Firstpost reviewed the series, giving three out of five stars and stated "Season 2 ends with what we have come to expect when a game of thrones is afoot – some will die, some will live, and the show will go on."

Ronak Kotecha of The Times of India rated the series three-and-a-half out of five stars and wrote "'Mirzapur' 2' has that 'killer' combination of power and politics that largely works, but is not bulletproof to flaws." Jyothi Sharma Bawa of Hindustan Times reviewed "For a show that revels in throwing references at you, here is one that Mirzapur 2 offers us right in the beginning – a scorpion with a sting in its tale." Rohit Vats of News18 gave two-and-a-half to the series stating "In Mirzapur 2, Ali Fazal and Pankaj Tripathi are unflinchingly staring at each other amid a barrage of bullets with a commitment to make all this look bizarrely satisfying."

Nandini Ramanath of Scroll. in reviewed "Mirzapur 2 might have not felt the need to invent new characters to ramp up the intrigue. These fresh entrants deliver enough scheming and maneuvering to last 10 episodes, but the show's writers, Puneet Krishna and Vineet Krishna aren't done yet. Like a Marvel Cinematic Universe franchise that stretches on unto eternity, a time-bound story revolving around revenge for fresh wounds is threatening to evolve into a saga that will persist for a few more seasons." Mughda Kapoor of Daily News and Analysis, rated three-and-a-half out of five to the show stating "Living up to the expectations of delivering an action-packed, fierce, and intense season, 'Mirzapur 2' surely makes for a great watch."

In contrast, Ektaa Malik from The Indian Express gave two out of five stars and stated "Mirzapur season two doesn't yet fall into the category of 'its soo bad that its good,’ nor does it fit into the 'guilty pleasure' slot." Saraswati Datar of The News Minute stated "The episodes, which start off at a brisk pace, slow down mid-way through the season. Yet this enviable ensemble of actors, who are undoubtedly some of the best in the business today, strive hard to stay invested and keep the proceedings going."

Accolades

References

External links

2018 Indian television series debuts
Amazon Prime Video original programming
Hindi-language television shows
Television shows set in Uttar Pradesh
Indian action television series
Indian crime television series
Fictional portrayals of the Uttar Pradesh Police
Television series about organized crime
Works about organised crime in India